Anthonia Ifeyinwa Achike is a Nigerian agricultural economist. She is a professor of Agricultural Economics and head of the Agricultural Economics Department at the University of Nigeria, Nsukka.

Early life 
Achike hails from Onitsha, in the state of Anambra. She earned a Ph.D. in Agricultural and Natural Resource Economics.

Career 
Achike attended training courses on quantitative and qualitative analytic methodologies, gender, poverty, policy, and other significant development themes. She received training at the CODESRIA Gender Institute in Dakar, Senegal, as well as the Social Science Academy of Nigeria Gender Institute. The African Economic Research Consortium (AERC) network taught her time series econometrics and game theory techniques. Furthermore, the Poverty and Economic Policy (PEP) network in Manila, Philippines, taught her in poverty mapping. 

She is a professor of Agricultural Economics at the University of Nigeria, Nsukka. She is currently the Director of the Gender and Development Policy Centre (Gen-Cent) at the University of Nigeria, Nsukka; Team Leader, Community Based Poverty Monitoring System (CBMS) in Nigeria; Coordinator, Agribusiness Development program of the African Network for Agriculture, Agroforestry, and Natural Resources Education (ANAFE); and Coordinator, Climate Change Project of the African Women in Science and Technology (AWFST), a program of the African Union (ATPS).

Membership of professional bodies 

 Member, African Association of Agricultural Economists
 Member, Nigerian Association of Agricultural Economists
 Member, Agricultural Extension Association of Nigeria
 Fellow, African Institute for Applied Economists

References 

Living people
Agricultural economists
Year of birth missing (living people)
Nigerian women economists
Nigerian economists